Latin American Grand Final is a 1969 painting by Australian artist John Brack. Part of a series of paintings on the theme of ballroom dancing painted by Brack in the late 1960s, the painting depicts two ballroom dancers – a man and a woman – in a dance competition.

Composition
Ballroom dancing was an activity that attracted Brack by means of its "absurdity ... a natural activity, such as dance, [converted] into a demanding and challenging ritual."
As part of his research Brack attended the 1967 World Ballroom Dancing Championships held at Festival Hall in Melbourne. He also collected photographs of ballroom dancing and subscribed to Australasian Dancing Times – a ballroom dancing magazine.

The painting shows the "lissom dancers in their richly decorated dresses and high-heeled shoes". It also includes a self-portrait of the artist in the top-left corner, "more vulnerable than the rest, dancing alone without a partner."

Reception
This painting and his other ballroom dancing works were first exhibited in 1970. While Brack thought this exhibition was his best work – better even than his 1955 paintings such as Collins St., 5 pm – sales were slow and critical reaction was mixed. Many critics felt that the "paintings were absurd and the colours jarring". However the works are now among the artist's most popular and sought-after.

The assistant curator of Australian painting and sculpture at the National Gallery of Australia, Lara Nicholls claims Brack uses dance as a metaphor for life and this work shows "false intimacy and false joy".

Provenance
The work was purchased by the National Gallery of Australia in 1981 and remains part of their collection.

References

External links
 Latin American Grand Final – National Gallery of Australia

Paintings by John Brack
1969 paintings
Collections of the National Gallery of Australia
Dance in art